Hate Mail is a Canadian short comedy-drama film, directed by Mark Sawers and released in 1993. The film stars Peter Outerbridge as Randall, a writer who works from home. Distracted by the constant noise from their neighbours while his wife Maggie (Molly Parker) is at work, Randall decides to forge eviction notices directed at all of them.

The film was part of a trilogy, with Stroke (1992) and Shoes Off! (1998).

It premiered at the 1993 Montreal World Film Festival.

The film was a Genie Award nominee for Best Live Action Short Drama at the 14th Genie Awards.

References

External links
 

1993 films
1993 short films
Canadian comedy-drama films
Films directed by Mark Sawers
1990s English-language films
Canadian drama short films
Canadian comedy short films
1990s Canadian films